

2017 Transfers

In

Out

References

Sports in Mayagüez, Puerto Rico